Abdul Karim Saeed Pasha (born 28 February 1945 in British India) is the fifth and current Emir of the Lahore Ahmadiyya Movement. In May 2007, he participated a conference in the Berlin Mosque, organized by the German and Dutch section of Ahmadiyya Anjuman. He was born in Mansehra, NWFP.

References

1945 births
Emirs of the Lahore Ahmadiyya Movement
Pakistani Ahmadis
Living people
People from Mansehra District